Justin Charles Hopkins Duckworth (born 1968) is the current Anglican Bishop of Wellington in New Zealand.

Early life and education 
Justin Duckworth was raised in Stokes Valley, New Zealand. His parents, Claire and Les Duckworth, separated when he was ten years old. His mother was an art teacher. Duckworth joined a Christian youth group, Youth for Christ, as a teenager and was baptized at age 15.  He earned a Bachelor of Science degree at Victoria University, then went on to earn advanced degrees in philosophy and theology. He also completed a master's degree in development studies at Massey University.

Urban Vision 
Duckworth worked with youth while studying.  After graduating from Virginia, he married Jenny Boland, whom he had met in the Youth for Christ group. Together, they ran a home for teenage girls in Newtown, a suburb of Wellington, New Zealand. After seven years, they moved to Upper Cuba street in Wellington, where Duckworth engaged in street ministry, reaching out to sex workers, the homeless and other marginalized persons.  The Duckworths began creating a community called Urban Vision. The community established communal homes in poor or disadvantaged parts of Wellington, where residents lived together in a cooperative model. The movement developed into a new religious communal order, a modern interpretation of the ancient monastic tradition within Christianity.

The Duckworths eventually established a contemporary monastery for the Urban Vision community, Ngatiawa, located in the valley of Reikorangi, where they lived for ten years. The community holds prayer services three times a day, and shares communal meals. In 2012, there were approximately 20 people living in the monastery on a regular basis and about one thousand visitors in a year.

Ordained ministry 
Duckworth was ordained in 2005. His work was not centered on parish ministry, but on building a contemporary communal order and monastery.  He did not serve as priest in a local church.

His nomination as bishop in 2012 was surprising to some in the church, because his ministry was unconventional.  Nevertheless, the selection was ratified by the House of Bishops and the General Synod. Duckworth was consecrated a bishop and installed on 30 June 2012. The service was held in the Anglican Cathedral in Wellington, and was attended by more than 1200 people.   He succeeded Tom Brown, who served as the diocesean bishop in Wellington from 1998 to 2012.

Personal life 
The Duckworths has three children, who have grown to adulthood.  Justin and Jenny Duckworth moved to Whanganui in 2018, to be closer to the Anglican churches in the northern part of the diocese of Wellington. Duckworth is known for his dreadlocks, and for often traveling barefoot.

References

1968 births
Living people
Anglican bishops of Wellington
21st-century Anglican bishops in New Zealand
People from Lower Hutt